Joshua Alvin Culibao (born May 24, 1994) is an Australian mixed martial artist who competes in the Featherweight division of the Ultimate Fighting Championship.

Background
The youngest of 4 siblings in a Filipino family, with his mother from Boracay while his father is from Pampanga, he was given the nickname "Kuya", a familial term used in a respectful manner to address an older male relative, brother, or friend, by his teammates at the Sydney-based Igor MMA, since he calls everyone in the gym by the Filipino kin endearment. Having practised taekwondo in his childhood, Culibao eventually started training mixed martial arts in order to lose weight in his adolescent years.

Before signing with the UFC, Culibao was a full-time electrician doing 40-plus-hour workweeks with training on top.

Mixed martial arts career

Early career
Starting his professional MMA career in 2016, Culibao compiled a perfect 8-0 record on the regional Australian scene, capturing three titles during this time. He won his debut at Superfight MMA 2 on February 19, 2016 by stopping Paul Traish in the first round via TKO. He would win his next two fights in the Urban Fight Night promotion; winning via majority decision against Brad Shortland at UFN 7 on May 7, 2016 and via TKO against Simon Arentz at UFN 8 on August 27, 2016. Culibao would fight his next two bouts in the Hex Fight Series promotion, winning the HEX Featherweight Championship against Raphael Berthet at HFS 7 after dropping his with a body shot and finishing him with soccer kicks. He defended this title at HFS 8 against Jordan Cameron, who he beat in a close bout via split decision. After returning to Urban Fight Nights for one bout which he won via majority decision against James McGlashan, Culibao won the DFC Featherweight Championship against Rodolfo Marques at DFC 7 on November 10, 2018 via head kick and ground and pound. He would then capture the Superfight MMA Featherweight championship against Josh Payne at Superfight MMA 10 on March 1, 2019, winning the bout via TKO in the first round.

Ultimate Fighting Championship
Culibao signed with the UFC in February 2020 to replace Jamie Mullarkey on short notice against Jalin Turner at UFC Fight Night: Felder vs. Hooker on February 23, 2020. He lost the fight via second-round knockout.

He made his sophomore appearance against Charles Jourdain at UFC on ESPN: Holm vs. Aldana on October 4, 2020. The bout ended in a split draw, which drew ire with most of the media scoring it for Jourdain.

Culibao faced Shayilan Nuerdanbieke at UFC Fight Night: Font vs. Garbrandt on May 22, 2021. He won the fight by unanimous decision.

Culibao was scheduled to face Damon Jackson on March 12, 2022 UFC Fight Night 203. However, Culibao was pulled from the event for undisclosed reasons and he was replaced by Kamuela Kirk.

Culibao faced Seung Woo Choi on June 11, 2022 at UFC 275. After knocking his opponent down multiple times during the fight, Culibao won the bout via split decision.

Culibao faced Melsik Baghdasaryan on February 12, 2023, at UFC 284. He won the fight via a rear-naked choke submission in the second round.

Championships and accomplishments
Hex Fight Series
HEX Featherweight Championship (one time; former)
One successful title defense
Diamondback FC
DFC Featherweight Championship (one time; former)
Superfight MMA
Superfight MMA Featherweight Championship (one time; former)

Mixed martial arts record

|-
|Win
|align=center|11–1–1
|Melsik Baghdasaryan
|Submission (rear-naked choke)
|UFC 284
|
|align=center|2
|align=center|2:02
|Perth, Australia 
|
|-
|Win
|align=center|10–1–1
|Seung Woo Choi
|Decision (split)
|UFC 275
|
|align=center|3
|align=center|5:00
|Kallang, Singapore
|
|-
|Win
|align=center|9–1–1
|Shayilan Nuerdanbieke
|Decision (unanimous)
|UFC Fight Night: Font vs. Garbrandt
|
|align=center|3
|align=center|5:00
|Las Vegas, Nevada, United States
|
|-
|Draw
|align=center|8–1–1
|Charles Jourdain
|Draw (split)
|UFC on ESPN: Holm vs. Aldana
|
|align=center|3
|align=center|5:00
|Abu Dhabi, United Arab Emirates
|
|-
|Loss
|align=center|8–1
|Jalin Turner
|TKO (punches)
|UFC Fight Night: Felder vs. Hooker
|
|align=center|2
|align=center|3:01
|Auckland, New Zealand
|
|-
| Win
| align=center|8–0
| Josh Payne
| TKO
| Superfight MMA 10
| 
| align=center|1
| align=center|3:02	
| Punchbowl, Australia
|
|-
| Win
| align=center| 7–0
| Rodolfo Marques
| TKO (head kick and punches)
| Diamondback FC 7
| 
| align=center| 4
| align=center| 0:00
| North Adelaide, Australia
| 
|-
| Win
| align=center| 6–0
| James McGlashan
| Decision (majority)
| Urban Fight Night 13
|
|align=Center|3
|align=center|5:00
|Liverpool, Australia
| 
|-
| Win
| align=center| 5–0
| Jordan Cameron
| Decision (split)
|Hex Fight Series 8
|
|align=center|5
|align=center|5:00
|Melbourne, Australia
|
|-
| Win
| align=center| 4–0
| Raphael Berthet
| TKO (punch to the body and soccer kicks)
|Hex Fight Series 7
|
|align=center|5
|align=center|1:35
|Melbourne, Australia
| 
|-
| Win
| align=center| 3–0
| Simon Arentz
| TKO (punches)
| Urban Fight Night 8
| 
| align=center| 1
| align=center| 4:49
| Liverpool, Australia
| 
|-
| Win
| align=center| 2–0
| Brad Shortland
| Decision (majority)
| Urban Fight Night 7
| 
| align=center| 3
| align=center| 5:00
| Liverpool, Australia
|
|-
| Win
| align=center| 1–0
| Paul Traish
| TKO (punches)
| Superfight MMA 2
| 
| align=center| 1
| align=center| 4:28
| Sydney, Australia
|

See also 
 List of current UFC fighters
 List of male mixed martial artists

References

External links 
  
 

1994 births
Living people
Australian male mixed martial artists
Featherweight mixed martial artists
Sportspeople from Sydney
Australian male taekwondo practitioners
Australian practitioners of Brazilian jiu-jitsu
Australian people of Filipino descent
Australian sportspeople of Asian descent
Sportspeople of Filipino descent
Ultimate Fighting Championship male fighters
Mixed martial artists utilizing taekwondo
Mixed martial artists utilizing Brazilian jiu-jitsu